Saint Patrick is an administrative parish of Saint Vincent and the Grenadines, on the island of Saint Vincent. According to the 2000 census, it had a population of 5,800, which makes Saint Patrick the least populous parish of Saint Vincent and the Grenadines. The parish consists of the middle portion of the leeward side of the main island.  Its capital is Barrouallie.

 Area: 37 km² (14 mi²)
 Population: 5,800 (2000 estimates)

Populated places
The following populated places are located within the parish of Saint Patrick:

 Barrouallie
 Hermitage
 Layou
 Rutland Vale
 Spring Village

References

External links

 Parishes of Saint Vincent and the Grenadines, Statoids.com

Parishes of Saint Vincent and the Grenadines